Artupa (also, Ardupa) is a village and municipality in the Astara Rayon of Azerbaijan.  It has a population of 1,882.

References 

Populated places in Astara District